Mohamed Yusuf (born 17 May 1968) is an Indonesian sprinter. He competed in the men's 4 × 100 metres relay at the 1988 Summer Olympics.

References

1968 births
Living people
Athletes (track and field) at the 1988 Summer Olympics
Indonesian male sprinters
Olympic athletes of Indonesia
Place of birth missing (living people)
20th-century Indonesian people